The Snob may refer to:

 The Snob (1924 film), a 1924 American silent drama film directed by Monta Bell
 The Snob (1921 film), a 1921 American film directed by Sam Wood

See also
 Snob, a person who believes in the existence of an equation between status and human worth